Aulotandra is a genus of plants native to Cameroon and Madagascar.

 Aulotandra angustifolia H.Perrier - Madagascar
 Aulotandra humbertii H.Perrier - Madagascar
 Aulotandra kamerunensis Loes - Cameroon
 Aulotandra madagascariensis Gagnep. - Madagascar
 Aulotandra trialata H.Perrier - Madagascar
 Aulotandra trigonocarpa H.Perrier - Madagascar

References

Alpinioideae
Zingiberaceae genera